Leena or Leena La Bianca (born January 5, 1963) is a former pornographic actress.

Early life
She grew up in Denver, Colorado. She began in the amateur side of the pornography industry before moving to California to become a full-time pornographic actress, with her professional pornographic debut in a movie also entitled Leena (1992). self-titled professional debut film, reviewed by Thomas McMahon, Adult Video News, December 1992.

Career
She has appeared in the Showtime cable series Sherman Oaks (1995) and softcore B-movies, such as Other Men's Wives (1996) and Femalien (1996). She has also acted in theater in the 1996 play Sweet Hostage and in 1998, she was in The Actors' Gang play, Steeltown.

Awards
 1994 AVN Award - Best Actress, Video (Blinded by Love)
 1994 XRCO Award - Best Actress, Single Performance (Blinded by Love)
 1995 AVN Award - Best Group Sex Scene, Video (Pussyman 5)
 1995 XRCO Award - Female Performer of the Year
 1995 FOXE Award - Female Fan Favorite
 2009 XRCO Hall of Fame inductee

References

External links

 
 
 

American pornographic film actresses
Living people
American people of Italian descent
Actresses from Denver
Pornographic film actors from Colorado
1963 births
21st-century American women